Zemaitis Guitar is a guitar brand owned by Japanese Kanda Shokai Corporation, which manufactures the instruments in Tokyo. Kanda Shokai is also owner of Greco, another guitar brand.

Zemaitis's guitars are based on designs by British luthier Tony Zemaitis, who died in 2002. In the United States, Zemaitis is distributed by the "Zemaitis Guitar Company" based out of Paso Robles, California. Current products by Zemaitis include electric and acoustic guitars.

Zemaitis is globally known for its unique metal and pearl front guitar designs. The brand's slogan is "The Elements of Tone".

History 
Born Antanus Casimere Zemaitis, of Lithuanian descent, Tony Zemaitis (as he is known to his friends), began a five-year apprenticeship as a cabinetmaker in 1951. He repaired his first guitar in 1952 and built his first instrument –a classical nylon-string guitar in 1955. Zemaitis started to build guitars for his friends, selling them the instruments at lower prices. After doing the military service, Zemaitis improved his methods to manufacture guitars. His instruments became popular in blues and folk music musicians of London, gaining good reputation among them. During the 1960s, Zemaitis made 12-string guitars for notable musicians including Ralph McTell, Spencer Davis, Eric Clapton and Jimi Hendrix.

After starting to build acoustic guitars, Zemaitis began to manufacture electric models, with some prototypes used by George Harrison. Other musicians that asked Zemaitis for guitars were Mark Bolan, Ron Wood and Ronnie Lane.

Zemaitis' characteristic metal front guitar was designed to reduce the humming of the electric guitars. His first metal-front was made for Tony McPhee, of The Groundhogs in the late 1960s. Inspiration for metal-fronts came for his observation of Fender guitars, upon which he considered they have design faults relating the position of the pickups in relationship to the strings. Zemaitis took the model from a radio magazine, where he noted that every unit had a metal chassis with the components mounted on it. Applying that principle to his guitar, he produced the first metal-front guitar.

Metal front guitars also included an engraved designs made by his friend and customer Danny O'Brien, who had started engraving plates for guitars headstock until Zemaitis himself suggested O'Brian to engrave the fronts, as well. Zemaitis' guitars became popular among rock artist and consolidated as a landmark of Zemaitis guitars. In the mid-1970s, Zemaitis made his first "mother of pearl" fronts for Ronnie Wood and James Honeyman-Scott.

Although Tony Zemaitis died in 2002, the demand for his guitars continued increasing, as well as their prices. The "Zemaitis" licensed guitars started to be manufactured in Japan, while many guitar makers worldwide copying Tony Zemaitis' designs to their own products.

Notable players 
Zemaitis has had many notable players use their guitars throughout the years such as Ronnie Wood, James Hetfield, Ronnie Lane, Keith Richards, Rich Robinson, Keith Nelson and Gilby Clark. In his later years, Zemaitis worked with a variety of influential guitarists like Joe Louis Walker, Christian Martucci, Ashes, Clay Cook and Ken Mochikoshi.

 Jimi Hendrix
 Keith Richards 
 Ronnie Wood
 Andy McCoy (Hanoi Rocks)
 Greg Lake 
 Tetsu Yamauchi
 George Harrison
 Eric Clapton
 Ronnie Lane (Faces)
 Mary Hopkin
 Paul McCartney
 Joe Walsh
 Ann Wilson
 Bob Dylan
 Marc Bolan
 David Gilmour
 Peter Frampton
 James Honeyman-Scott (The Pretenders)
 Richie Sambora (Bon Jovi)
 Gary Grainger (Rod Stewart)
 Simon Hinkler (The Mission UK)
 Dave Sharp (The Alarm)
 Charlie Starr (Blackberry Smoke)
 James Hetfield (Metallica)
 Rich Robinson (The Black Crowes)
 Miku Kobato (Band-Maid)
 Geddy Lee (Rush)
 Yoshi (Aldious)
 Mike Oldfield
 Tom Keifer
 Jim Cregan
 John Corabi
 Dave Dalton Screaming Bloody Marys
 Yutaka Higuchi (BUCK-TICK)
 Giac Belli The deep Burrito

References

External links

 Japan website
 USA website

Design companies established in 1955
Guitar manufacturing companies of the United States
1955 establishments in England
Manufacturing companies established in 1955
Companies based in San Luis Obispo County, California